The Progress Party is a centrist, big tent party in Jersey, formed in 2021 to compete for the 2022 Jersey general election. Senator Steve Pallett leads the party, which includes current Deputy Steve Luce and former Deputy Eddie Noel.

Party policies include a points-based immigration system, the construction of a new hospital in Jersey, and a review of publicly-owned property on the island for the purpose of building or repurposing existing buildings on said property for affordable housing. In April 2022, the Progress Party entered into a political pact with the Jersey Liberal Conservatives Party. The two parties agreed to promote a joint manifesto and candidates as well as advocating Liberal Conservative leader Philip Bailhache for the role of Chief Minister.

Electoral performance 

 Note

References

External links 

Political parties in Jersey
Political parties established in 2021